Changa is the fifth studio album by Australian electronic trio Pnau. It was released on 10 November 2017 by the independent label etcetc. It follows their 2012 remix album in collaboration with Elton John, Good Morning to the Night, and is their first studio album since Soft Universe (2011). It is also their first album as a trio, with vocalist and co-founder Nick Littlemore's brother Sam Littlemore joining in 2016.

The album was preceded by the lead single "Chameleon" in November 2016, which reached number four on the ARIA Singles Chart, and number 11 on the Triple J Hottest 100, 2016. It features vocals by Kira Divine. It has received over 25 million streams on Spotify and been certified double platinum by the Australian Recording Industry Association. On 25 August, Pnau released three more tracks in promotion of the album: "Into the Sky", "Young Melody" featuring Vera Blue, and "Control Your Body", with "Into the Sky" debuting on Triple J. Divine also lent vocals to "Control Your Body". "Into the Sky" was accompanied by a video of Nick Littlemore as a floating head set against psychedelic visuals. "Go Bang" was released as a single on 27 October.

In the lead-up to the album's release, the trio embarked on an Australian tour, performing at the Listen Out festival in Sydney on 30 September, and at the Adelaide dance event Oh Yes.

At the ARIA Music Awards of 2018, Changa was nominated for ARIA Award for Album of the Year.

Music and themes
Upon its release, Mixmag compared "Young Melody" to the "smooth lounge vibes of PNAU's sublime debut LP Sambanova". Pnau said of "Into the Sky": "It is a song that wrote itself. We like to think that it captures the ambition, angst and ambivalence we held as teenagers." Nick Littlemore commented that the trio had been influenced by Happy Mondays for the song. Al Newstead of ABC called "Into the Sky" a "fuzzy, distorted drum heavy track that [...] tak[es] inspiration from the 'Madchester' '90s dance scene". He also labeled "Young Melody" a "blissful dance" track, and noted the "4am rave vibes" of "Control Your Body". Amnplify described "Control Your Body" as having "enigmatic instrumentation and vocals before settling into a deep rhythmic groove – a true acid workout and a nostalgic homage to the bands  formative rave days".

"Chameleon" was additionally called a "festival favourite and dance floor anthem".

Album title
The album is named after Changa, the DMT-infused smokeable form of ayahuasca.

Track listing

Notes
 Tracks 1, 2, 3, 4, 5, 9 and 10 feature vocals by Kira Divine.
 The bonus tracks from the 2018 tour edition came from their previous album Pnau.

Charts

References

2017 albums
Pnau albums